Goddo was a Canadian rock band formed in Scarborough, Ontario in 1975. Goddo had mixed major label success from the mid-1970s to the early 1980s. After reforming in 1989, they revived their career with several new studio and 'best of' packages. Goddo signed to Bullseye Records of Canada. Goddo disbanded after their last show on December 15 2018 at the Phoenix Concert Theatre in Toronto. Goddo's last show with the original recording band and most famous lineup of Greg Godovitz, Gino Scarpelli, and Doug Inglis was at Spot 1 Grill & Music Hall, Brampton, in October 2018.

Discography

Studio albums
 Goddo (1977)
 If Indeed It's Lonely at the Top... WHO CARES... It's Lonely at the Bottom Too! (1978)
 An Act of Goddo (1979) CAN No.82
 Pretty Bad Boys (1981) CAN No. 45
 12 Gauge Goddo (1990)
 King of Broken Hearts (1992)
 Kings of the Stoned Age (2003)

Live albums
 Lighve: Best Seat in the House (1980) CAN No. 26
 2nd Best Seat in the House - Lighve (2004)
 Under My Hat - Volume 1: Active Goddo (2008)

Singles
 "Louie Louie" (1975) CAN No. 75
 "Under My Hat" (1977)
 "There Goes My Baby" (1978)
 "Chantal" (1979)
 "Fortune in Men's Eyes" (1980)
 "Pretty Bad Boy" (1981) CAN No. 28
 "If Tomorrow Never Comes" (1981)
 "Was It Something I Said" (1993)
 "Rock Star" (2004)
 "Such a Fool" (2004)

References

External links
 Interview Goddo
 Goddo Reunion Makes Good Out of TO's Bad Boys
 Canadian Bands website 
 

Attic Records (Canada) artists
Canadian rock music groups
Musical groups from Toronto
Scarborough, Toronto
Musical groups established in 1975
Musical groups disestablished in 2018
1975 establishments in Ontario
2018 disestablishments in Ontario